Striarina is a monotypic genus of brachiopods belonging to the family Basiliolidae. The only species is Striarina valdiviae.

The species is found in Indian Ocean.

References

Brachiopod genera
Rhynchonellida
Monotypic brachiopod genera